Aprilov is a Bulgarian male surname, its feminine counterpart is Aprilova. It may refer to
Boris Aprilov (1921–1995), Bulgarian writer, playwright, satirist, and humourist
Vasil Aprilov (1789–1847), Bulgarian educator

Bulgarian-language surnames